Myricanone is a cyclic diarylheptanoid isolated from the bark of Myrica rubra (Myricaceae).

References 

Diarylheptanoids
Macrocycles
O-methylated natural phenols
Cyclophanes
Ketones
Biphenyls